Karim Robin (born April 28, 1984 in Saint-Vallier) is a French professional footballer. He currently plays in the Championnat de France amateur for Gap FC.

Robin played at the professional level in Ligue 2 for ASOA Valence.

1984 births
Living people
French footballers
Ligue 2 players
ASOA Valence players
Gap HAFC players
Association football midfielders
Chambéry SF players